Carlena is a given name. Notable people with this name include the following:

Carlena Williams (1942 – 2013), American vocalist
Olivia Carlena Cole, known as Olivia Cole (1942 – 2018), American actress

See also

Carlen (surname)
Carlene (name)
Carlina (name)
Carolena Carstens

Given names
English feminine given names
English-language feminine given names